Julián Robles García (born 28 March 1981 in Palma de Mallorca, Balearic Islands) is a Spanish retired professional footballer who played as a midfielder, currently manager of RCD Mallorca B.

Managerial statistics

Honours
Mallorca
Copa del Rey: 2002–03

References

External links

1981 births
Living people
Spanish footballers
Footballers from Palma de Mallorca
Association football midfielders
La Liga players
Segunda División players
Segunda División B players
RCD Mallorca B players
RCD Mallorca players
Ciudad de Murcia footballers
Real Valladolid players
Polideportivo Ejido footballers
CE Sabadell FC footballers
CF Badalona players
Spain youth international footballers
Spain under-21 international footballers
Spanish football managers
Tercera División managers
Segunda Federación managers
Tercera Federación managers
RCD Mallorca B managers